The 2016 FIA European Truck Racing Championship is a motor-racing championship using highly tuned tractor units. It was the 32nd year of the championship. Jochen Hahn won the championship with MAN.

Teams and drivers

Calendar and winners

Championship Overall Standings

Drivers' Championship

Each round or racing event consisted of four races. At each race, points were awarded to the top ten classified finishers using the following structure:

† – Drivers did not finish the race, but were classified as they completed over 75% of the race distance.

References

External links

European Truck Racing Championship seasons
European Truck Racing Championship
Truck Racing Championship